Thihathu of Ava (also known as Aung Pinle Hsinbyushin Thihathu; 1394–1425) was king of Ava from 1421 to 1425. Though he opportunistically renewed the Forty Years' War with Hanthawaddy Pegu in 1422, Thihathu agreed to a peace treaty with Prince Binnya Ran in 1423. His subsequent marriage to Ran's sister Princess Shin Saw Pu helped keep the peace between the two kingdoms when Ran became king of Pegu in 1424.

Thihathu was assassinated in 1425 in a coup engineered by Queen Shin Bo-Me. He is remembered as the Aung Pinle Hsinbyushin nat in the pantheon of Burmese nat spirits.

Early life
Born on 3 June 1394, Minye Thihathu (မင်းရဲ သီဟသူ) was the third child of Prince Min Swe of Pyinzi and Princess Shin Mi-Nauk. His father was a son of then King Swa Saw Ke of Ava while his mother was a daughter of Sawbwa (Chief) Tho Ngan Bwa (Si Lun Fa) of Mohnyin. The prince had two older siblings Prince Minye Kyawswa and Princess Saw Pyei Chantha, and a younger brother Prince Minye Kyawhtin. The family lived in Pyinzi, 60 km south of the capital Ava (Inwa), until 1400. Thihathu was six when his father ascended the Ava throne with the title of Minkhaung on 25 November 1400.

Thihathu grew up in Ava amidst the Forty Years' War with the southern Mon-speaking kingdom of Hanthawaddy Pegu. He became second in line to the Ava throne  December 1406 when his elder brother Minye Kyawswa was appointed crown prince. This prompted their uncle Prince Theiddat of Sagaing, who was instrumental in placing Minkhaung on the throne and had considered himself heir apparent, to defect to Pegu in 1407. After the death of Theiddat  July 1408, Minkhaung appointed his middle son governor of Sagaing, the capital of the northern province.

Governorships
In the next eight years, Thihathu held two important governorships at Sagaing and at Prome. He remained in the shadow of Minye Kyawswa until his elder brother's death in 1415, before emerging as the next heir apparent in 1416.

Sagaing (1408–1413)
His time at Sagaing was unremarkable. Unlike his militaristic elder brother, Thihathu did not take a major role in the military. Except for one naval operation to protect the riverine supply lines along the Irrawaddy in 1409–1410, he did not take part in any of the campaigns between 1408 and 1413. Though Thihathu was governor of Sagaing, when China and her client Shan states began raiding Ava's northern territories, it was Minye Kyawswa that Minkhaung recalled to face the enemy in 1412 and again in 1413. In 1413, Minkhaung reassigned Thihathu to Prome, the key frontline city near the Hanthawaddy border.

Prome (1413–1416)
His first year at Prome was quiet although Ava and Pegu were still officially at war. Thihathu led the southern command until 1414 when Minye Kyawswa returned to lead the next invasion of Pegu in 1414. The 1414–1415 campaign proved to be the height of the Forty Years' War but both missions Thihathu led failed. First, his naval convoy protecting Ava supply lines was driven back in the Irrawaddy delta by Prince Binnya Bassein. His next assignment to open a new front into Pegu via Toungoo (Toungoo) also failed; Thihathu and his deputy Gov. Thado of Mohnyin could not even get past the first Hanthawaddy garrison at Fort Sayat.

Nevertheless, Thihathu became in charge of the southern command after Minye Kyawswa's death in 1415. In 1416, he led an 8000-strong army to decisively defeat the 7000-strong army led by Prince Binnya Dhammaraza near Toungoo. It was Thihathu's first real military success but Minkhaung was pleased with his son's performance. The king not only appointed Thihathu heir-apparent but also married him to Saw Min Hla, the widow of Minye Kyawswa.

Crown prince
As crown prince, Thihathu continued to be responsible for the war effort. In 1417, he invaded the south by land and river with 16,000 troops. After much fighting, his forces managed to capture Dagon and Hmawbi, forcing Razadarit to leave Pegu for Martaban for a time. But they could not advance to Pegu before the rainy season of 1418 arrived. They made no further gains, and had to retreat in the following dry season. Thihathu did bring back Prince Binnya Set of Dagon as a war captive to Ava. Minkhaung treated Set well in Ava but did not return him. By keeping Set in Ava, Minkhaung felt he had evened the score with his southern rival, and launched no more campaigns. Razadarit too observed the impromptu ceasefire. The ceasefire lasted to the end of reigns of Minkhaung and Razadarit both of whom died in late 1421 within two months of each other.

Reign

Accession
Minye Thihathu ascended the throne with Saw Min Hla by his side  October 1421. The 27-year-old king also raised his father's favorite queen Shin Bo-Me as his own. His reign name was Thiha Thura Maha Dhamma Yaza (သီဟသူရ မဟာ ဓမ္မရာဇာ; Pali: Sīhasura Mahādhammarājā). Shortly after, he added the title of Hsinbyushin (ဆင်ဖြူရှင်; "Lord of the White Elephant") when two of his vassals presented two white elephants, considered highly propitious by Burmese monarchs.

Renewal of war with Pegu (1422–1423)
Thihathu's first major act as king was to renew the war with Pegu in early 1422. It was an opportunistic attempt to take advantage of the succession crisis following Razadarit's unexpected death  December 1421. Thihathu decided to get involved when Prince Binnya Kyan of Dala, one of the pretenders to the throne, sought his help. Though he could only dispatch two regiments (2000 troops) on short notice, it was enough to retake Dala from the troops of King Binnya Dhammaraza (r. 1421–1424). But the success was short lived. The ensuing indiscriminate looting and deportations of townfolk by the Ava troops greatly angered Kyan, who soon reached a deal with his older brother Dhammaraza drive out the northerners. Dhammaraza sent another army to Dala while Kyan treacherously engineered the murder of principal officers of the Ava army inside Dala. Only about half the Ava troops got back to Prome. Prome's southernmost district Tharrawaddy (Thayawadi) fell to Prince Binnya Ran, another pretender to the Hanthawaddy throne.

Thihathu was now forced to respond. At the start of the next dry season, in November/December 1422, he sent an 8000-strong army led by Gov. Thado of Mohnyin and a 6000-man naval force led by Gov. Nyo of Kale Kye-Taung. Their main target was the Irrawaddy delta, which was controlled by Ran, who by then had emerged as the principal power in the south. (The nominal king Dhammaraza controlled only around the capital Pegu while Kyan had just moved to Martaban (Mottama) as viceroy of the eastern province.) Ava troops went on occupy the delta, taking Khebaung, Bassein (Pathein), and Dala in succession, and laid siege to Dagon where Ran was based. A month into the siege, Ran offered his full sister Princess Shin Saw Pu in a marriage alliance, and renounced his claim to Tharrawaddy. Unlike his late fiery brother, Thihathu did not consider Hanthawaddy an enemy that must be defeated. Thihathu readily accepted the offer, and came down by the royal barge surrounded by another 7000 troops to Dagon to formalize the treaty with Ran. He married the 28-year-old princess, who was a widow with two young children, as a principal queen. Upon withdrawal, Thihathu made a point to stop by Tharrawaddy, the land he had regained.

Last years
According to the royal chronicles, Thihathu was completely enamored with Shin Saw Pu, and spent most of his time with her. This led to a jealous rage by his previous favorite queen, Shin Bo-Me. It was not the first time that Thihathu discarded his older consorts. After his accession, he spent so much of his time with Bo-Me, who was also his father Minkhaung's favorite queen, that his chief queen Saw Mon Hla moved out of the palace to retire into religion.

Unlike Mon Hla, Bo-Me would not go away quietly. To place Prince Nyo of Kale Kye-Taung on the throne, she arranged to have the king assassinated. In August 1425, Nyo's ally Gov. Le Than Bwa of Onbaung (Hsipaw/Thibaw) with a sizable force ambushed Thihathu at Aung Pinle (modern Amarapura, Mandalay), the location Bo-Me had provided. Though undermanned, Thihathu fought back the enemy on his war elephant but was killed after being hit by three arrow shots. The king was 31.

Having suffered a violent death, Thihathu entered the Burmese pantheon of nats as Aung Pinle Hsinbyushin. As a nat, He is portrayed sitting cross-legged on a throne on elephantback in full regalia, with one of the elephant attendants crouching in front and another on horseback wielding a sword.

Chronicles remember him as a handsome, good-natured, and womanizing royal. He was succeeded by his eight-year-old son Min Hla. However, Min Hla's reign lasted just three months as Bo-Me poisoned him, and put Nyo on the throne.

Family
Thihathu had three queens and three children. According to the Maha Yazawin, Thihathu's first marriage was to his first cousin Princess Min Hla Htut but the marriage soon ended in divorce. But the Yazawin Thit rejects that the marriage ever occurred; Hmannan Yazawin accepts Yazawin Thit's rejection.

Historiography
The royal chronicles do not all agree on the king's key life events.

Ancestry
From his mother's side, Thihathu was descended from the sawbwas of Mohnyin. From his father's side, he was descended from kings of Ava, and ultimately from the Pagan dynasty; he was a two times great grandson of King Kyawswa of Pagan (r. 1289–1297).

Notes

References

Bibliography
 
 
 
 
 
 
 
 
 

Ava dynasty
1425 deaths
1394 births
Assassinated Burmese people
12
15th-century Burmese monarchs
Burmese people of Shan descent